The 2021 Russian mixed doubles curling Olympic trials were held from September 21 to 25 and October 16 to 20 at the Yug Sport Complex in Kislovodsk, Russia. The winning pair of Anna Sidorova and Alexey Timofeev earned the right to represent the Russian Olympic Committee at the Olympic Qualification Event. There, they went 4–2 through the round robin, qualifying for the playoffs. After defeating Hungary in the semifinals, they were beaten by the United States in the qualification final, not advancing to the 2022 Winter Olympics in Beijing, China.

The trials process was contested between six teams. It was held in two legs where a double round robin format was played in each. In the second leg, only eight of the ten draws needed to be played before Anna Sidorova and Alexey Timofeev were declared the winners. Had another team won the second leg, a best-of-three series would've been held between the winners of the first and second legs to determine the champion. The other five pairs included Nkeirouka Ezekh and Alexey Stukalskiy, Maria Komarova and Daniil Goriachev, Daria Morozova and Oleg Krasikov, Anastasia Moskaleva and Alexander Eremin and Anna Samoylik and Mikhail Vaskov.

Teams
The teams are listed as follows:

Leg 1

Round-robin standings
Final round-robin standings

Round-robin results
All draw times are listed in Moscow Time (UTC+03:00).

Draw 1
Tuesday, September 21, 12:30

Draw 2
Tuesday, September 21, 18:00

Draw 3
Wednesday, September 22, 12:30

Draw 4
Wednesday, September 22, 18:00

Draw 5
Thursday, September 23, 12:30

Draw 6
Thursday, September 23, 18:00

Draw 7
Friday, September 24, 12:30

Draw 8
Friday, September 24, 18:00

Draw 9
Saturday, September 25, 12:30

Draw 10
Saturday, September 25, 18:00

Leg 2

Round-robin standings
After Draw 8

Round-robin results
All draw times are listed in Moscow Time (UTC+03:00).

Draw 1
Saturday, October 16, 11:30

Draw 2
Saturday, October 16, 17:00

Draw 3
Sunday, October 17, 11:30

Draw 4
Sunday, October 17, 17:00

Draw 5
Monday, October 18, 11:30

Draw 6
Monday, October 18, 17:00

Draw 7
Tuesday, October 19, 11:30

Draw 8
Tuesday, October 19, 17:00

Final standings

References

External links
Official Website

2021 in Russian sport
Curling at the 2022 Winter Olympics
September 2021 sports events in Russia
October 2021 sports events in Russia
Olympic Curling Trials
Russian Olympic Committee athletes at the Olympics
Sports competitions in Sochi